Daniel Oren Hastings (March 5, 1874 – May 9, 1966) was an American lawyer and politician from Wilmington, New Castle County, Delaware. He was a member of the Republican Party who served two terms as a U.S. Senator from Delaware.

Early life and family
Hastings was born in Somerset County, Maryland, near Princess Anne, Maryland. He studied law at Columbian University, now George Washington University, and was admitted to the Delaware Bar in 1902. He lived and practiced law in Wilmington, Delaware.

Political career
Hastings served as Deputy Attorney General of Delaware from 1904 until 1909, Secretary of State of Delaware from January 1909 to June 1909. He resigned to accept an appointment as Associate Justice of the Delaware Supreme Court, and served there until his resignation in January 1911. He was Special Counsel for the Delaware General Assembly in 1911, City Solicitor of Wilmington from 1911 until 1917, and Judge of the Municipal Court of Wilmington from 1920 until 1929.

Hastings was appointed to the U. S. Senate upon the resignation of U.S. Senator T. Coleman du Pont, December 10, 1928 and served the remainder of his term. During this term, he served with the Republican majority in the 70th and 71st Congress. He was elected in his own right to a full term as U. S. Senator, in 1930, defeating Democrat Thomas F. Bayard, Jr., a former U. S. Senator.

During this term, he served with the Republican majority in the 72nd Congress, but was in the minority during the 73rd and 74th Congress. Hastings lost his bid for a second full term in 1936 to Democrat James H. Hughes, a lawyer from Dover, Delaware. In all he served from December 10, 1928, to January 2, 1937, during the administrations of U.S. Presidents Herbert Hoover and Franklin D. Roosevelt. He then returned to the practice of law in Wilmington.

Death and legacy
Hastings died at Wilmington and is buried in the Lower Brandywine Cemetery, near Centerville, Delaware.

Almanac
Elections are held the first Tuesday after November 1. U.S. Senators are popularly elected and took office March 4 for a six-year term.

References

Images
Biographical Directory of the United States Congress

External links
Biographical Directory of the United States Congress 
Delaware’s Members of Congress 

The Political Graveyard

1874 births
1966 deaths
Methodists from Delaware
People from Wilmington, Delaware
People from Princess Anne, Maryland
Delaware lawyers
Delaware Republicans
Secretaries of State of Delaware
Burials in New Castle County, Delaware
Republican Party United States senators from Delaware